The doctrine of the Trinity, considered the core of Christian theology by Trinitarians, is the result of continuous exploration by the church of the biblical data, thrashed out in debate and treatises, eventually formulated at the First Council of Nicaea in AD 325 in a way they believe is consistent with the biblical witness, and further refined in later councils and writings. The most widely recognized Biblical foundations for the doctrine's formulation are in the Gospel of John, which possess ideas that originate in Platonism and Greek philosophy.

Nontrinitarianism is any of several Christian beliefs that reject the Trinitarian doctrine that God is three distinct persons in one being. Modern nontrinitarian groups views differ widely on the nature of God, Jesus, and the Holy Spirit.

Historical theology is the academic study of theological history.

Background

Jewish origins 

Christianity originated in the 1st century CE as a minor sect within Second Temple Judaism (516 BC – AD 70). The basic tenets of Jewish religion were ethical monotheism, the Torah (or Law), and eschatological hope in a future messianic age. This era also overlapped with the Hellenistic period, which saw Greek culture spread and become the dominant culture of the Mediterranean region. A major challenge for Jews during this time was how to respond to Hellenization and remain faithful to their religious traditions. 

In the 1st century, Judaism was divided into a number of competing sects. There were Pharisees, Sadducees, Essenes, and other groups. Each group adopted different stances toward Hellenization. Sadducees emphasized the sacrifice and ritual that could only take place at the Temple in Jerusalem. They only recognized the written Torah as authoritative. The Pharisees recognized the oral Torah in addition to the written Torah, and they emphasized personal conduct over ritual. Unlike the Sadducees, Pharisees believed in an afterlife and a resurrection of the dead. Apocalyptic movements, such as the Essenes, also existed. These groups promoted Jewish eschatological beliefs in which the Jewish nation would be saved by the promised Messiah.

The Hebrew Bible developed in this period as Jews decided which religious texts had special status. The Greek-speaking Jews of Alexandria produced a Greek translation of the Bible called the Septuagint that included books later identified as the Apocrypha, which were excluded from the modern Hebrew Bible and the Protestant Bible. The Septuagint was influential on early Christianity as it was the Bible used by the first Christian authors.

Hellenistic Judaism was a movement that sought to combine Judaism with the best elements of Greek culture. Philo of Alexandria, who lived around the same time as Jesus, attempted to harmonize the Jewish scriptures with Greek philosophy through an allegorical interpretation of the Bible.

Greek influences 

Church historian Diarmaid MacCulloch has observed that "Christianity in its first five centuries was in many respects a dialogue between Judaism and Graeco-Roman philosophy". The most important philosophical influence was Platonism: 

 Plato's doctrine of the two worlds (the visible world and the world of Ideas) was used by some Christian authors to inform Christian ideas of the "world" and also heaven and earth. 
 Plato's theory of the soul was used by Christians to defend their own beliefs about immortality and life after death.  
Under the influence of Platonic epistemology (theory of knowledge), Christians adopted a distrust of sensory perception as a means of attaining knowledge. Nevertheless, Christians rejected the Platonic idea that learning is actually "recall" or "reminiscence" as this required belief in the pre-existence of souls, which Christians rejected.  
Plato's Idea of the Good had a significant influence on Christian conceptions of God. In Platonic thought, the supreme deity was perfect and unchangeable. But this supreme god lacked "compassion for human tragedy, because compassion is a passion or emotion" which involves changes in mood. This was a very different deity from the biblical God. While the God of the Bible was transcendent, he was also passionate and compassionate towards humans. Indeed, the biblical God was constantly intervening in the affairs of Israel. Despite these differences, "there arose the custom, deeply entrenched in some theological circles, of speaking of God in the same terms Plato used to refer to the Idea of the Good: God is impassive, infinite, incomprehensible, indescribable, and so on."
Another important influence was Stoicism, which made two important contributions to early Christian thought:

 The Stoics taught there was a universal reason or  through which all people are able to know and understand.
 The Stoics also taught the existence of a natural law, which was knowable to all people. Christians adopted the concept of natural law as the foundation of Christian ethics.

Early Church (c. 30–500)

Earliest Christian writings 

Christianity centers on the life and teachings of Jesus of Nazareth, who lived . The only surviving Christian sources from the first century are texts that were later included in the New Testament. The earliest of these are the Pauline epistles, letters written to various Christian congregations by Paul the Apostle. The epistles provide information on what early Christian communities believed about Jesus. Three themes are apparent:
 Jesus is the way that God can be known. He is the "image of the invisible God" (Colossians 1:15) and God's "exact representation" (Hebrews 1:3).
 Jesus makes salvation possible. 
 The resurrection of Jesus confirms the truth of his identity. Through faith, believers experience union with Jesus and both share in his suffering and the hope of his resurrection.   

The four canonical gospels of Matthew, Mark, Luke, and John are ancient biographies of Jesus' life. The synoptic gospels (Matthew, Mark, Luke) were probably written between AD70 and AD100. The Gospel of John was written about one or two decades later. The canonical gospels focus on three themes:
 What Jesus taught, particularly the parables of Jesus.
 What Jesus did, particularly the miracles of Jesus.
 What witnesses said about Jesus.

As the Christ or "Anointed One" ( in Greek), Jesus is identified as the fulfillment of messianic prophecies in the Hebrew scriptures. Through the accounts of his miraculous virgin birth, the gospels present Jesus as the Son of God. In an appropriation of Greek philosophical concepts, John's Gospel identifies Jesus as the divine logos by which the world was created: "And the Word became flesh and lived among us, and we have seen his glory" (John 1:14). The major emphasis of Jesus' preaching was the imminent coming of the Kingdom of God. The gospel accounts conclude with a description of the crucifixion and resurrection of Jesus, ultimately leading to his Ascension.

To Jewish audiences, early preaching focused on Jesus as the fulfillment of Israel's messianic hopes (see for example the Apostle Peter's sermon in Acts 2). When preaching to Greek audiences, however, Christians appealed to the Greek intellectual tradition. This approach can be seen in the Areopagus sermon delivered by the Apostle Paul as described in Acts 17. Citing Athenian worship of the Unknown God, Paul proclaims that this god is revealed to humanity through Jesus. Quoting the Athenian poet Aratus, Paul states that in God "we live and move and have our being" (Acts 17:28).

The first Christians were Jewish Christians, and the center of Christianity was the church in Jerusalem. The Acts of the Apostles records that during the 40s and 50s AD there was controversy over circumcision and the place of Gentiles (non-Jews) in the movement. The Judaizers believed that Gentile Christians needed to follow Jewish laws and customs, particularly circumcision, to be saved. Paul, however, argued that no one could be made righteous or justified by following the law of Moses but only through faith in Jesus, citing the prophet Habakkuk: "he who through faith is righteous shall live" (Habbakuk 2:4). At the Council of Jerusalem held in 49 AD, it was decided that Gentile believers would not have to undergo circumcision.    

The influence of the Jerusalem church and its form of Jewish Christianity declined after the Jewish revolt of 66–70 AD and never recovered. Pauline theology became the mainstream form of Christianity, and "all Christians alive today are the heirs of the Church which Paul created."

Biblical canon 

The Biblical canon is the set of books Christians regard as divinely inspired and thus constituting the Christian Bible.  Though the early church used the Old Testament according to the canon of the Septuagint (LXX), the apostles did not otherwise leave a defined set of new scriptures; instead the New Testament developed over time.

The writings attributed to the apostles circulated amongst the earliest Christian communities. The Pauline epistles were circulating in collected form by the end of the 1st century AD. Justin Martyr, in the early 2nd century, mentions the "memoirs of the apostles", but his references are not detailed.  Around 160 Irenaeus of Lyons argued for only four Gospels (the Tetramorph), and argued that it would be illogical to reject Acts of the Apostles but accept the Gospel of Luke, as both were from the same author.  By the early 200's, Origen may have been using the same 27 books as in the modern New Testament, though there were still disputes over the canonicity of Hebrews, James, II Peter, II and III John, and Revelation, see Antilegomena.  Likewise by 200 the Muratorian fragment shows that there existed a set of Christian writings somewhat similar to what is now the 27-book New Testament.

In his Easter letter of 367, Athanasius, Bishop of Alexandria, gave a list exactly the same in number and order with what would become the New Testament canon and be accepted by the Greek church.  The African Synod of Hippo, in 393, approved the New Testament, as it stands today, together with the Septuagint books, a decision that was repeated by the Council of Carthage (397) and the Council of Carthage (419). Pope Damasus I's Council of Rome in 382, only if the Decretum Gelasianum is correctly associated with it, issued a biblical canon identical to that mentioned above.  In 405, Pope Innocent I sent a list of the sacred books to a Gallic bishop, Exsuperius of Toulouse.  Nonetheless, a full dogmatic articulation of the canon was not made until the Council of Trent in the 16th century.

Patristic theology 

As Christianity spread, it acquired certain members from well-educated circles of the Hellenistic world; they sometimes became bishops but not always.  They produced two sorts of works: theological and "apologetic", the latter being works aimed at defending the faith by using reason to refute arguments against the veracity of Christianity.  These authors are known as the church fathers, and study of them is called Patristics.  Notable early Fathers include Justin Martyr, Irenaeus, Tertullian, Clement of Alexandria, Origen, etc.

A large quantity of theological reflection emerged in the early centuries of the Christian church—in a wide variety of genres, in a variety of contexts, and in several languages—much of it the product of attempts to discuss how Christian faith should be lived in cultures very different from the one in which it was born.  So, for instance, a good deal of the Greek language literature can be read as an attempt to come to terms with Hellenistic culture.  The period sees the slow emergence of orthodoxy (the idea of which seems to emerge from the conflicts between Catholic Christianity and Gnostic Christianity), the establishment of a Biblical canon, debates about the doctrine of the Trinity (most notably between the councils of Nicaea in 325 and Constantinople in 381), about Christology (most notably between the councils of Constantinople in 381 and Chalcedon in 451), about the purity of the Church (for instance in the debates surrounding the Donatists), and about grace, free will and predestination (for instance in the debate between Augustine of Hippo and Pelagius).

Ante-Nicene Fathers 

Influential texts and writers in the 2nd century include:
 The collection known as the Apostolic Fathers (mostly 2nd century)
 Justin Martyr (c. 100/114–c. 162/168)
 Clement of Alexandria (died c. 215)
 Irenaeus of Lyons (c. 130–202)
 Various 'Gnostic' authors, such as Marcion (c. 85-c. 160), Valentinius (c. 100–c. 153) and Basilides (c. 117–138)
 Some of the texts commonly referred to as the New Testament apocrypha.

Influential texts and writers between c. 200 and 325 (the First Council of Nicaea) include:
 Tertullian (c. 155–230)
 Hippolytus (died 235)
 Origen (c. 182–c. 251)
 Cyprian (died c. 258)
 Arius (256–336)
 Other Gnostic texts and texts from the New Testament apocrypha.

Nicene Creed 

Each phrase in the Nicene Creed, which was hammered out at the Council of Nicaea, addresses some aspect that had been under passionate discussion and closes the books on the argument, with the weight of the agreement of the over 300 bishops in attendance. [Constantine had invited all 1800 bishops of the Christian church (about 1000 in the east and 800 in the west). The number of participating bishops cannot be accurately stated; Socrates Scholasticus and Epiphanius of Salamis counted 318; Eusebius of Caesarea, only 250.] In spite of the agreement reached at the council of 325 the Arians who had been defeated dominated most of the church for the greater part of the 4th century, often with the aid of Roman emperors who favored them.

Nicene and Post-Nicene Fathers 

Late antique Christianity produced a great many renowned church fathers who wrote volumes of theological texts, including SS. Augustine, Gregory Nazianzus, Cyril of Jerusalem, Ambrose of Milan, Jerome, and others.  What resulted was a golden age of literary and scholarly activity unmatched since the days of Virgil and Horace.  Some of these fathers, such as John Chrysostom and Athanasius, suffered exile, persecution, or martyrdom from heretical Byzantine Emperors.  Many of their writings are translated into English in the compilations of Nicene and Post-Nicene Fathers.

Influential texts and writers between AD 325 and c. 500 include:
 Athanasius (298–373)
 The Cappadocian Fathers (late 4th century)
 Ambrose (c. 340–397)
 Jerome (c. 347–420)
 Chrysostom (347–407)
 Augustine of Hippo (354–430)
 Cyril of Alexandria (376–444)

Texts from patristic authors after AD 325 are collected in the Nicene and Post-Nicene Fathers. Important theological debates also surrounded the various Ecumenical Councils—Nicaea in 325, Constantinople in 381, Ephesus in 431 and Chalcedon in 451.

Papacy and primacy 

The theology of the Bishop of Rome having a monarchal papacy developed over time. As a bishopric, its origin is consistent with the development of an episcopal structure in the 1st century. The origins of papal primacy concept are historically obscure; theologically, it is based on three ancient Christian traditions: (1) that the apostle Peter was preeminent among the apostles, (2) that Peter ordained his successors as Bishop of Rome, and (3) that the bishops are the successors of the apostles.  As long as the Papal See also happened to be the capital of the Western Empire, prestige of the Bishop of Rome could be taken for granted without the need of sophisticated theological argumentation beyond these points; after its shift to Milan and then Ravenna, however, more detailed arguments were developed based on  etc.  Nonetheless, in antiquity the Petrine and Apostolic quality, as well as a "primacy of respect", concerning the Roman See went unchallenged by emperors, eastern patriarchs, and the Eastern Church alike.  The Ecumenical Council of Constantinople in 381 affirmed Rome as "first among equals". By the close of antiquity, the doctrinal clarification and theological arguments on the primacy of Rome were developed.  Just what exactly was entailed in this primacy, and its being exercised, would become a matter of controversy at certain later times.

Early heresies 

Urgent concerns with the uniformity of belief and practice have characterized Christianity from the outset.  The New Testament itself speaks of the importance of maintaining orthodox doctrine and refuting heresies, showing the antiquity of the concern.  The development of doctrine, the position of orthodoxy, and the relationship between the early Church and early heretical groups is a matter of academic debate.  Some scholars, drawing upon distinctions between Jewish Christians, Gentile Christians, and other groups such as Gnostics, see Early Christianity as fragmented and with contemporaneous competing orthodoxies.

The process of establishing orthodox Christianity was set in motion by a succession of different interpretations of the teachings of Christ being taught after the crucifixion. Though Christ himself is noted to have spoken out against false prophets and false christs within the gospels themselves Mark 13:22 (some will arise and distort the truth in order to draw away disciples), Matthew 7:5-20, Matthew 24:4, Matthew 24:11 Matthew 24:24 (For false christs and false prophets will arise).  On many occasions in Paul's epistles, he defends his own apostleship, and urges Christians in various places to beware of false teachers, or of anything contrary to what was handed to them by him. The epistles of John and Jude also warn of false teachers and prophets, as does the writer of the Book of Revelation and 1 Jn. 4:1, as did the Apostle Peter warn in 2 Pt. 2:1-3:.

One of the roles of bishops, and the purpose of many Christian writings, was to refute heresies.  The earliest of these were generally Christological in nature, that is, they denied either Christ's (eternal) divinity or humanity.  For example, Docetism held that Jesus' humanity was merely an illusion, thus denying the incarnation; whereas Arianism held that Jesus was not eternally divine. Many groups were dualistic, maintaining that reality was composed into two radically opposing parts: matter, usually seen as evil, and spirit, seen as good. Orthodox Christianity, on the other hand, held that both the material and spiritual worlds were created by God and were therefore both good, and that this was represented in the unified divine and human natures of Christ.

Irenaeus (c. 130–202) was the first to argue that his "proto-orthodox" position was the same faith that Jesus gave to the apostles, and that the identity of the apostles, their successors, and the teachings of the same were all well-known public knowledge. This was therefore an early argument supported by apostolic succession. Irenaeus first established the doctrine of four gospels and no more, with the synoptic gospels interpreted in the light of John. Irenaeus' opponents, however, claimed to have received secret teachings from Jesus via other apostles which were not publicly known. Gnosticism is predicated on the existence of such hidden knowledge, but brief references to private teachings of Jesus have also survived in the canonic Scripture as did warning by the Christ that there would be false prophets or false teachers. Irenaeus' opponents also claimed that the wellsprings of divine inspiration were not dried up, which is the doctrine of continuing revelation.

In the middle of the 2nd century, three groups of Christians adhered to a range of doctrines that divided the Christian communities of Rome: the teacher Marcion, the pentecostal outpourings of ecstatic Christian prophets of a continuing revelation, in a movement that was called "Montanism" because it had been initiated by Montanus and his female disciples, and the gnostic teachings of Valentinus. Early attacks upon alleged heresies formed the matter of Tertullian's Prescription Against Heretics (in 44 chapters, written from Rome), and of Irenaeus' Against Heresies (ca 180, in five volumes), written in Lyons after his return from a visit to Rome. The letters of Ignatius of Antioch and Polycarp of Smyrna to various churches warned against false teachers, and the Epistle of Barnabas, accepted by many Christians as part of Scripture in the 2nd century, warned about mixing Judaism with Christianity, as did other writers, leading to decisions reached in the first ecumenical council, which was convoked by the Emperor Constantine at Nicaea in 325, in response to further disruptive polemical controversy within the Christian community, in that case Arian disputes over the nature of the Trinity.

During those first three centuries, Christianity was effectively outlawed by requirements to venerate the Roman emperor and Roman gods. Consequently, when the Church labelled its enemies as heretics and cast them out of its congregations or severed ties with dissident churches, it remained without the power to persecute them. However, those called "heretics" were also called a number of other things (e.g. "fools", "wild dogs", "servants of Satan"), so the word "heretic" had negative associations from the beginning, and intentionally so.

Before 325 AD, the "heretical" nature of some beliefs was a matter of much debate within the churches. After 325 AD, some opinion was formulated as dogma through the canons promulgated by the councils.

Medieval theology

Byzantine theology
While the Western Roman Empire declined and fell, the Eastern Roman Empire, centred on Constantinople, remained standing until 1453, and was the home of a wide range of theological activity that was seen as standing in strong continuity with the theology of the Patristic period; indeed the division between Patristic and Byzantine theology would not be recognised by many Orthodox theologians and historians.

Mystical theology
 Pseudo-Dionysius the Areopagite (working c. 500)
 Symeon the New Theologian (949–1022)
 Gregory Palamas (1296–1359)

Christological controversy after Chalcedon
 Severus of Antioch (c. 465–518)
 Leontius of Jerusalem (working 538–544)
 Maximus the Confessor (c. 580–682)

Iconoclasts and iconophiles
 Patriarch Germanus I of Constantinople (patriarch 715–730)
 John of Damascus (676–749)
 Theodore the Studite (c. 758–c. 826)

Heresies

Western theology

Before the Carolingian Empire
When the Western Roman Empire fragmented under the impact of various 'barbarian' invasions, the Empire-wide intellectual culture that had underpinned late Patristic theology had its interconnections cut.  Theology tended to become more localised, more diverse, more fragmented.  The classically clothed Christianity preserved in Italy by men like Boethius and Cassiodorus was different from the vigorous Frankish Christianity documented by Gregory of Tours which was different again from the Christianity that flourished in Ireland and Northumbria in the 7th and 8th centuries.  Throughout this period, theology tended to be a more monastic affair, flourishing in monastic havens where the conditions and resources for theological learning could be maintained.

Important writers include:
 Caesarius of Arles (c. 468–542)
 Boethius (480–524)
 Cassiodorus (c. 480–c. 585)
 Pope Gregory I (c. 540–604)
 Isidore of Seville (c. 560–636)
 Bede (672–736)

Theology in the time of Charlemagne
Both because it made communication between different Christian centres easier, and because there was a concerted effort by its rulers to encourage educational and religious reforms and to develop greater uniformity in Christian thought and practice across their territories, the establishment of the Carolingian Empire saw an explosion of theological inquiry, and theological controversy.  Controversy flared, for instance, around 'Spanish Adoptionism, around the views on predestination of Gottschalk, or around the eucharistic views of Ratramnus.

Important writers include:
 Alcuin (c. 735–804)
 The Spanish Adoptionists Felix of Urgel and Elipandus of Toledo (late 8th century)
 Rabanus Maurus (c. 780–856)
 Radbertus (c. 790–865)
 Ratramnus (died c. 868)
 Hincmar (806–882)
 Gottschalk (c. 808–c. 867)
 Johannes Scotus Eriugena (c. 815–877)

Before Scholasticism
With the division and decline of the Carolingian Empire, notable theological activity was preserved in some of the cathedral schools that had begun to rise to prominence under it—for instance at Auxerre in the 9th century or Chartres in the 11th.  Intellectual influences from the Arabic world (including works of classical authors preserved by Islamic scholars) percolated into the Christian West via Spain, influencing such theologians as Gerbert of Aurillac, who went on to become Pope Sylvester II and mentor to Otto III.  (Otto was the fourth ruler of the Germanic Ottonian Holy Roman Empire, successor to the Carolingian Empire).  With hindsight, one might say that a new note was struck when a controversy about the meaning of the eucharist blew up around Berengar of Tours in the 11th century: hints of a new confidence in the intellectual investigation of the faith that perhaps foreshadowed the explosion of theological argument that was to take place in the 12th century.

Notable authors include:
 Heiric of Auxerre (c. 835–887)
 Remigius of Auxerre (c. 841–908)
 Gerbert of Aurillac (c. 950–1003)
 Fulbert of Chartres (died 1028)
 Berengar of Tours (c. 999–1088)
 Lanfranc (died 1089)

Scholasticism

Early scholasticism and its contemporaries
Anselm of Canterbury is sometimes misleadingly called the 'Father of Scholasticism' because of the prominent place that reason has in his theology; instead of establishing his points by appeal to authority, he presents arguments to demonstrate why it is that the things he believes on authority must be so.  His particular approach, however, was not very influential in his time, and he kept his distance from the cathedral schools.  We should look instead to the production of the gloss on Scripture associated with Anselm of Laon, the rise to prominence of dialectic (middle subject of the medieval trivium) in the work of Abelard, and the production by Peter Lombard of a collection of Sentences or opinions of the Church Fathers and other authorities.  Scholasticism proper can be thought of as the kind of theology that emerges when, in the cathedral schools and their successors, the tools of dialectic are pressed into use to comment upon, explain, and develop the gloss and the sentences.

Notable authors include:
 Anselm of Canterbury (1033/1034–1109)
 Anselm of Laon (died 1117)
 Hugh of St Victor (1078–1151)
 Peter Abelard (1079–1142)
 Bernard of Clairvaux (1090–1153)
 Hildegard of Bingen (1098–1179)
 Peter Lombard (c. 1100–1160)
 Joachim of Fiore (c. 1135–1202)

High Scholasticism and its contemporaries
The 13th century saw the attempted suppression of various groups perceived as heterodox, such as the Cathars and Waldensians and the associated rise of the mendicant orders (notably the Franciscans and Dominicans), in part intended as a form of orthodox alternative to the heretical groups.  Those two orders quickly became contexts for some of the most intense scholastic theology, producing such 'high scholastic' theologians as Alexander of Hales (Franciscan) and Thomas Aquinas (Dominican), or the rather less obviously scholastic Bonaventure (Franciscan).  The century also saw a flourishing of mystical theology, with women such as Mechthild of Magdeburg playing a prominent role.  In addition, the century can be seen as period in which the study of natural philosophy that could anachronistically be called 'science' began once again to flourish in theological soil, in the hands of such men as Robert Grosseteste and Roger Bacon.

Notable authors include:

 Saint Dominic (1170–1221)
 Robert Grosseteste (c. 1175–1253)
 Francis of Assisi (1182–1226)
 Alexander of Hales (died 1245)
 Mechthild of Magdeburg (1210–1285)
 Roger Bacon (1214–1294)
 Bonaventure (1221–1274)
 Thomas Aquinas (1225–1274)
 Angela of Foligno (1248–1309)

Late Scholasticism and its contemporaries
Scholastic theology continued to develop as the 13th century gave way to the fourteenth, becoming ever more complex and subtle in its distinctions and arguments.  The 14th century saw in particular the rise to dominance of the nominalist or voluntarist theologies of men like William of Ockham.  The 14th century was also a time in which movements of widely varying character worked for the reform of the institutional church, such as conciliarism, Lollardy and the Hussites.  Spiritual movements such as the Devotio Moderna also flourished.

Notable authors include:

 Meister Eckhart (1260–1328)
 Duns Scotus (1266–1308)
 Marsilius of Padua (1270–1342)
 William of Ockham (c. 1285–1349)
 John Wycliffe (c. 1320–1384)
 Julian of Norwich (1342–1413)
 Geert Groote (1340–1384)
 Catherine of Siena (1347–1380)
 Jean Gerson (1363–1429)
 Jan Hus (c. 1369–1415)
 Thomas à Kempis (1380–1471)

Renaissance and Reformation
The Renaissance yielded scholars the ability to read the scriptures in their original languages and this in part stimulated the Reformation. Martin Luther, a Doctor in Bible at the University of Wittenburg, began to teach that salvation is a gift of God's grace, attainable only through faith in Jesus, who in humility paid for sin. "This one and firm rock, which we call the doctrine of justification", insisted Martin Luther, "is the chief article of the whole Christian doctrine, which comprehends the understanding of all godliness." Along with the doctrine of justification, the Reformation promoted a higher view of the Bible. As Martin Luther said, "The true rule is this: God's Word shall establish articles of faith, and no one else, not even an angel can do so." These two ideas in turn promoted the concept of the priesthood of all believers. Other important reformers were John Calvin, Huldrych Zwingli, Philipp Melanchthon, Martin Bucer and the Anabaptists. Their theology was modified by successors such as Theodore Beza, the English Puritans and Francis Turretin.

Lutheranism

Lutheranism is a major branch of Western Christianity that identifies with the teachings of Luther. Luther's efforts to reform the theology and practice of the church launched The Reformation. As a result of the reactions of his contemporaries, Christianity was divided. Luther's insights were a major foundation of the Protestant movement.

The start of the Reformation

In 1516–17, Johann Tetzel, a Dominican friar and papal commissioner for indulgences, was sent to Germany by the Roman Catholic Church to sell indulgences to raise money to rebuild St Peter's Basilica in Rome. Roman Catholic theology stated that faith alone, whether fiduciary or dogmatic, cannot justify man; and that only such faith as is active in charity and good works (fides caritate formata) can justify man. One such good work is donating money to the church.

On 31 October 1517, Luther wrote to Albrecht, Archbishop of Mainz and Magdeburg, protesting the sale of indulgences. He enclosed in his letter a copy of his "Disputation of Martin Luther on the Power and Efficacy of Indulgences", which came to be known as The 95 Theses. Hans Hillerbrand writes that Luther had no intention of confronting the church, but saw his disputation as a scholarly objection to church practices, and the tone of the writing is accordingly "searching, rather than doctrinaire". Hillerbrand writes that there is nevertheless an undercurrent of challenge in several of the theses, particularly in Thesis 86, which asks: "Why does the pope, whose wealth today is greater than the wealth of the richest Crassus, build the basilica of St. Peter with the money of poor believers rather than with his own money?"

Luther objected to a saying attributed to Johann Tetzel that "As soon as the coin in the coffer rings, the soul from purgatory springs", insisting that, since forgiveness was God's alone to grant, those who claimed that indulgences absolved buyers from all punishments and granted them salvation were in error. Christians, he said, must not slacken in following Christ on account of such false assurances.

According to Philipp Melanchthon, writing in 1546, Luther nailed a copy of the 95 Theses to the door of the Castle Church in Wittenberg that same day—church doors acting as the bulletin boards of his time—an event now seen as sparking the Protestant Reformation, and celebrated each year on 31 October as Reformation Day. Some scholars have questioned the accuracy of Melanchthon's account, noting that no contemporaneous evidence exists for it. Others have countered that no such evidence is necessary, because this was the customary way of advertising an event on a university campus in Luther's day.

The 95 Theses were quickly translated from Latin into German, printed, and widely copied, making the controversy one of the first in history to be aided by the printing press. Within two weeks, the theses had spread throughout Germany; within two months throughout Europe.

Justification by faith

From 1510 to 1520, Luther lectured on the Psalms, the books of Hebrews, Romans, and Galatians. As he studied these portions of the Bible, he came to view the use of terms such as penance and righteousness by the Roman Catholic Church in new ways. He became convinced that the church was corrupt in their ways and had lost sight of what he saw as several of the central truths of Christianity, the most important of which, for Luther, was the doctrine of justification—God's act of declaring a sinner righteous—by faith alone through God's grace. He began to teach that salvation or redemption is a gift of God's grace, attainable only through faith in Jesus as the messiah.

Luther came to understand justification as entirely the work of God. Against the teaching of his day that the righteous acts of believers are performed in cooperation with God, Luther wrote that Christians receive such righteousness entirely from outside themselves; that righteousness not only comes from Christ but actually is the righteousness of Christ, imputed to Christians (rather than infused into them) through faith. "That is why faith alone makes someone just and fulfills the law", he wrote. "Faith is that which brings the Holy Spirit through the merits of Christ." Faith, for Luther, was a gift from God. He explained his concept of "justification" in the Smalcald Articles:

Response of the papacy

In contrast to the speed with which the theses were distributed, the response of the papacy was painstakingly slow.

Cardinal Albrecht of Hohenzollern, Archbishop of Mainz and Magdeburg, with the consent of Pope Leo X, was using part of the indulgence income to pay his bribery debts, and did not reply to Luther's letter; instead, he had the theses checked for heresy and forwarded to Rome.

Leo responded over the next three years, "with great care as is proper", by deploying a series of papal theologians and envoys against Luther. Perhaps he hoped the matter would die down of its own accord, because in 1518 he dismissed Luther as "a drunken German" who "when sober will change his mind".

Widening breach
Luther's writings circulated widely, reaching France, England, and Italy as early as 1519, and students thronged to Wittenberg to hear him speak. He published a short commentary on Galatians and his Work on the Psalms. At the same time, he received deputations from Italy and from the Utraquists of Bohemia; Ulrich von Hutten and Franz von Sickingen offered to place Luther under their protection.

This early portion of Luther's career was one of his most creative and productive. Three of his best known works were published in 1520: To the Christian Nobility of the German Nation, On the Babylonian Captivity of the Church, and On the Freedom of a Christian.

Finally on 30 May 1519, when the Pope demanded an explanation, Luther wrote a summary and explanation of his theses to the Pope. While the Pope may have conceded some of the points, he did not like the challenge to his authority so he summoned Luther to Rome to answer these. At that point Frederick the Wise, the Saxon Elector, intervened. He did not want one of his subjects to be sent to Rome to be judged by the Catholic clergy so he prevailed on the Holy Roman Emperor Charles V, who needed Frederick's support, to arrange a compromise.

An arrangement was effected, however, whereby that summons was cancelled, and Luther went to Augsburg in October 1518 to meet the papal legate, Cardinal Thomas Cajetan. The argument was long but nothing was resolved.

Excommunication
On 15 June 1520, the Pope warned Luther with the papal bull (edict) Exsurge Domine that he risked excommunication unless he recanted 41 sentences drawn from his writings, including the 95 Theses, within 60 days.

That autumn, Johann Eck proclaimed the bull in Meissen and other towns. Karl von Miltitz, a papal nuncio, attempted to broker a solution, but Luther, who had sent the Pope a copy of On the Freedom of a Christian in October, publicly set fire to the bull and decretals at Wittenberg on 10 December 1520, an act he defended in Why the Pope and his Recent Book are Burned and Assertions Concerning All Articles.

As a consequence, Luther was excommunicated by Leo X on 3 January 1521, in the bull Decet Romanum Pontificem.

Political maneuvering
What had started as a strictly theological and academic debate had now turned into something of a social and political conflict as well, pitting Luther, his German allies and Northern European supporters against Charles V, France, the Italian Pope, their territories and other allies. The conflict would erupt into a religious war after Luther's death, fueled by the political climate of the Holy Roman Empire and strong personalities on both sides.

In 1526, at the First Diet of Speyer, it was decided that, until a General Council could meet and settle the theological issues raised by Martin Luther, the Edict of Worms would not be enforced and each Prince could decide if Lutheran teachings and worship would be allowed in his territories. In 1529, at the Second Diet of Speyer, the decision the previous Diet of Speyer was reversed—despite the strong protests of the Lutheran princes, free cities and some Zwinglian territories. These states quickly became known as Protestants. At first, this term Protestant was used politically for the states that resisted the Edict of Worms. Over time, however, this term came to be used for the religious movements that opposed the Roman Catholic tradition in the 16th century.

Lutheranism would become known as a separate movement after the 1530 Diet of Augsburg, which was convened by Charles V to try to stop the growing Protestant movement. At the Diet, Philipp Melanchthon presented a written summary of Lutheran beliefs called the Augsburg Confession.  Several of the German princes (and later, kings and princes of other countries) signed the document to define "Lutheran" territories.  These princes would ally to create the Schmalkaldic League in 1531, which led to the Schmalkald War, 1547, a year after Luther's death, that pitted the Lutheran princes of the Schmalkaldic League against the Catholic forces of Charles V.

After the conclusion of the Schmalkald War, Charles V attempted to impose Catholic religious doctrine on the territories that he had defeated. However, the Lutheran movement was far from defeated. In 1577, the next generation of Lutheran theologians gathered the work of the previous generation to define the doctrine of the persisting Lutheran church. This document is known as the Formula of Concord. In 1580, it was published with the Augsburg Confession, the Apology of the Augsburg Confession, the Large and Small Catechisms of Martin Luther, the Smalcald Articles and the Treatise on the Power and Primacy of the Pope. Together they were distributed in a volume entitled The Book of Concord. This book is still used today.

Results of the Lutheran reformation
Luther's followers and the Roman Catholic Church broke fellowship during the Protestant Reformation. In the years and decades following Luther's posting of the 95 theses on the door of the Wittenberg church, large numbers of Europeans abandoned observance of papal authority, including the majority of German speakers. Following the Counter-Reformation, Catholic Austria and Bavaria, together with the electoral archbishops of Mainz, Cologne, and Trier consolidated the Catholic position on the German-speaking section of the European continent. Because Luther sparked this mass movement, he is known as the father of the Protestant Reformation, and the father of Protestantism in general.

Calvinism

Arminianism

 Humans are naturally unable to make any effort towards salvation
 Salvation is possible by grace alone
 Works of human effort cannot cause or contribute to salvation
 God's election is conditional on faith in Jesus
 Jesus' atonement was potentially for all people
 God allows his grace to be resisted by those unwilling to believe
 Salvation can be lost, as continued salvation is conditional upon continued faith

Orthodox Reformation
The fall of Constantinople in the East, 1453, led to a significant shift of gravity to the rising state of Russia, the "Third Rome". The Renaissance would also stimulate a program of reforms by patriarchs of prayer books. A movement called the "Old Believers" consequently resulted and influenced Russian Orthodox theology in the direction of conservatism and Erastianism.

Counter-Reformation

The Roman Catholic counter-reformation spearheaded by the Jesuits under Ignatius Loyola took their theology from the decisions of the Council of Trent,  and developed Second Scholasticism, which they pitted against Lutheran Scholasticism. The overall result of the Reformation was therefore to highlight distinctions of belief that had previously co-existed uneasily.

The Council of Trent

Revivalism (1720–1906)

First Great Awakening

Second Great Awakening

Third Great Awakening

Restoration Movement

The Restoration Movement (also known as the "Stone-Campbell Movement") generally refers to the "American Restoration Movement", which began on the American frontier during the Second Great Awakening of the early 19th century. The movement sought to reform the church and unite Christians. Barton W. Stone and Alexander Campbell each independently developed similar approaches to the Christian faith, seeking to restore the whole Christian church, on the pattern set forth in the New Testament. Both groups believed that creeds kept Christianity divided. They joined in fellowship in 1832 with a handshake.
They were united, among other things, in the belief that Jesus is the Christ, the Son of God, that churches celebrate the Lord's Supper on the first day of each week, and that baptism of adult believers, by immersion in water, is a necessary condition for Salvation.

The Restoration Movement began as two separate threads, each of which initially developed without the knowledge of the other, during the Second Great Awakening in the early 19th century. The first, led by Barton W. Stone began at Cane Ridge, Bourbon County, Kentucky. The group called themselves simply Christians. The second, began in western Pennsylvania and Virginia (now West Virginia), led by Thomas Campbell and his son, Alexander Campbell. Because the founders wanted to abandon all denominational labels, they used the biblical names for the followers of Jesus that they found in the Bible. Both groups promoted a return to the purposes of the 1st-century churches as described in the New Testament.  One historian of the movement has argued that it was primarily a unity movement, with the restoration motif playing a subordinate role.

The Restoration Movement has seen several divisions, resulting in multiple separate groups.  Three modern groups claim the Stone Campbell movement as their roots: Churches of Christ, Christian churches and churches of Christ, and the Christian Church (Disciples of Christ).  Some see divisions in the movement as the result of the tension between the goals of restoration and ecumenism, with the Churches of Christ and Christian churches and churches of Christ resolving the tension by stressing restoration while the Christian Church (Disciples of Christ) resolved the tension by stressing ecumenism.

Restorationism

The Church of Jesus Christ of Latter-day Saints
Jehovah's Witnesses

Modern theology
After the Reformation Protestant groups continued to splinter, leading to a range of new theologies. The "Enthusiasts" were so named because of their emotional zeal. These included the Methodists, the Quakers and Baptists. Another group sought to reconcile Christian faith with "Modern" ideas, sometimes causing them to reject beliefs they considered to be illogical, including the Nicene creed and Chalcedonian Creed. these included Unitarians and Universalists. A major issue for Protestants became the degree to which Man contributes to his salvation. The debate is often viewed as synergism versus monergism, though the labels Calvinist and Arminian are more frequently used, referring to the conclusion of the Synod of Dort.

The 19th century saw the rise of biblical criticism, new knowledge of religious diversity in other continents and above all the growth of science. This led many church men to espouse a form of Deism. This, along with concepts such as the brotherhood of man and a rejection of miracles led to what is called "Classic Liberalism". Immensely influential in its day, classic liberalism suffered badly as a result of the two world wars and fell prey to the criticisms of postmodernism.

Vladimir Lossky is a famous Eastern Orthodox theologian writing in the 20th century for the Greek church.

Modern Catholic response to Protestantism
Well into the 20th century, Catholics—even if no longer resorting to persecution—still defined Protestants as heretics. Thus, Hilaire Belloc – in his time one of the most conspicuous speakers for Catholicism in Britain – was outspoken about the "Protestant Heresy". He even defined Islam as being "A Christian heresy", on the grounds that Muslims accept many of the tenets of Christianity but deny the godhood of Jesus (see Hilaire Belloc#On Islam).

However, in the second half of the century – and especially in the wake of Vatican II – the Catholic Church, in the spirit of ecumenism, tends not to refer to Protestantism as a heresy nowadays, even if the teachings of Protestantism are indeed heretical from a Catholic perspective. Modern usage favors referring to Protestants as "separated brethren" rather than "heretics", although the latter is still on occasion used vis-a-vis Catholics who abandon their church to join a Protestant denomination. Many Catholics consider Protestantism to be material rather than formal heresy, and thus non-culpable.

Some of the doctrines of Protestantism that the Catholic Church considers heretical are the belief that the Bible is the only source and rule of faith ("sola scriptura"), that faith alone can lead to salvation ("sola fide") and that there is no sacramental, ministerial priesthood attained by ordination, but only a universal priesthood of all believers.

Postmodern Christianity

Postmodern theology seeks to respond to the challenges of post modern and deconstructionist thought, and has included the death of God movement, process theology, feminist theology and Queer Theology and most importantly neo-orthodox theology. Karl Barth, Rudolf Bultmann and Reinhold Niebuhr were neo-orthodoxies main representatives. In particular Barth labeled his theology "dialectical theology", a reference to existentialism.

The predominance of Classic Liberalism resulted in many reactionary movements amongst conservative believers. Evangelical theology, Pentecostal or renewal theology and fundamentalist theology, often combined with dispensationalism, all moved from the fringe into the academy. Marxism stimulated the significant rise of Liberation theology  which can be interpreted as a rejection of academic theology that fails to challenge the establishment and help the poor.

From the late 19th century to the early twentieth groups established themselves that derived many of their beliefs from Protestant evangelical groups but significantly differed in doctrine. These include the Jehovah's Witnesses, the Latter Day Saints and many so called "cults". Many of these groups use the Protestant version of the Bible and typically interpret it in a fundamentalist fashion, adding, however, special prophecy or scriptures, and typically denying the trinity and the full deity of Jesus Christ.

Ecumenical Theology sought to discover a common consensus on theological matters that could bring the many Christian denominations together. As a movement it was successful in helping to provide a basis for the establishment of the World Council of Churches and for some reconciliation between more established denominations. But ecumenical theology was nearly always the concern of liberal theologians, often Protestant ones. The movement for ecumenism was opposed especially by fundamentalists and viewed as flawed by many neo-orthodox theologians.

Liberation theology

Radical orthodoxy

Radical orthodoxy is a form of philosophical theology that has been influenced by the Nouvelle Theologie, especially of Henri de Lubac.

An ecumenical movement begun by John Milbank and others at Cambridge, radical orthodoxy seeks to examine classic Christian writings and related neoplatonic texts in full dialogue with contemporary, philosophical perspectives. Predominantly Anglican and Roman Catholic in orientation, it has received positive responses from high places in those communions: one of the movement's founders, Catherine Pickstock, received a letter of praise from Joseph Ratzinger before he became Pope, while Rowan Williams, the Archbishop of Canterbury, has contributed to the movement's publications. A major hearth of radical orthodoxy remains the Centre of Theology and Philosophy  at the University of Nottingham.

Weak theology
Weak theology is a branch of postmodern Christianity that has been influenced by the deconstructive thought of Jacques Derrida, including Derrida's description of a moral experience he calls "the weak force." Weak theology rejects the idea that God is an overwhelming physical or metaphysical force. Instead, God is an unconditional claim without any force whatsoever. As a claim without force, the God of weak theology does not intervene in nature. As a result, weak theology emphasizes the responsibility of humans to act in this world here and now.

See also 
 History of Christian thought on persecution and tolerance

Notes

Citations

Sources
 
 
 
 ₯

Further reading

 
Theology